John Popovich (March 6, 1918 – February 3, 2004) was an American football player and coach. He played in the National Football League from 1944 to 1945, for the Pittsburgh Steelers and "Card-Pitt", a team that was the result of a temporary merger between the Chicago Cardinals and the Steelers.  The merger was result of the manning shortages experienced league-wide due to World War II. Popovich was signed to "Card-Pitt" midway through the season, after he returned from the Army due to a medical discharge.  Popvich served as the head football coach at Waynesburg College—now known as Waynesburg University—in Waynesburg, Pennsylvania from 1955 to 1958, compiling a record of 12–16–4.

Head coaching record

References

External links
 

1918 births
2004 deaths
American football halfbacks
Card-Pitt players
Pittsburgh Steelers players
Saint Vincent Bearcats football players
Waynesburg Yellow Jackets football coaches
People from Westmoreland County, Pennsylvania
Coaches of American football from Pennsylvania
Players of American football from Pennsylvania
American people of Serbian descent
United States Army personnel of World War II